Rosamond Skypark  is a residential airpark and public-use airport located three nautical miles (6 km) west of the central business district of Rosamond, in Kern County, California, United States. It is privately owned by the Rosamond Skypark Association.

Facilities and aircraft 
Rosamond Skypark covers an area of 100 acres (40 ha) at an elevation of 2,415 feet (736 m) above mean sea level. It has one runway designated 8/26 with an asphalt surface measuring 3,600 by 50 feet (1,097 x 15 m).

For the 12-month period ending May 3, 2011, the airport had 15,000 general aviation aircraft operations, an average of 41 per day. At that time there were 71 aircraft based at this airport: 89% single-engine, 4% multi-engine, 1% helicopter, 3% glider, and 3% ultralight.

The facility was designed by aeronautical engineer Sam Ramsey, who resided at the sleepy airport for years prior to the development. He envisioned an airport where pilots could commute to Los Angeles while enjoying the quiet High Desert as a residence.

See also

 List of airports in Kern County, California

References

External links 
 Rosamond Skypark
 Aerial image as of June 1994 from USGS The National Map
 

Airports in Kern County, California
Residential airparks
Rosamond, California